Llangedywn Church In Wales Primary School (known as Llangedwyn C in W Primary School) is a primary school in the Tanat Valley in Mid Wales on the border with Shropshire. It has served the village of Llangedwyn and the surrounding community in Powys and Shropshire since 1825. It has strong links with, and is situated near, St. Cedwyn's Church in Llangedwyn

About the school
The school has two large classrooms, and a hall used for school and church assemblies, indoor activities, and meals. There is a large tarmac playground, and a well-equipped, brightly coloured adventure playground. A large field adjoins the school, for football, sports days, and various outdoor activities during the summer.

According to the school's latest ESTYN report, "Llangedwyn is a good school with strong community values. The headteacher and all staff work effectively to provide an interesting and wide range of experiences for the pupils." The school has strong links with the community. A book was published to celebrate the 100th anniversary of Llangedwyn's building.

Llangedwyn School is in the County of Powys in Mid Wales in the catchment area of Llanfyllin, and appears in The Good Schools Guide

References

External links
 Llangedwyn C in W Primary School Website
 ESTYN Report on Llangedwyn C in W Primary School

Primary schools in Powys
Educational institutions established in 1825
Church in Wales schools
1825 establishments in Wales